Neuropeptide K (also known as neurokinin K), is a protein encoded by the TAC1 gene. It is an elongated derivative of the N-terminus of neurokinin A as the final post-translational processing product of beta-preprotachykinin.

Like neurokinin A, neuropeptide K has been localized to sensory neurons and likely plays a role in regulating sensation.

While several mammalian brains are shown to express substance P and neurokinin A, they differ on expression of neurokinin A-derived peptides. In contrast with rat and cow brains, the human brain contains larger amounts of neuropeptide K.

References 

Neuropeptides
Neurotransmitters